Buffalo Trace may refer to:

 Buffalo Trace (road), a pioneer trail in southern Indiana
 Buffalo Trace Distillery, a maker of bourbon whiskey
 Buffalo Trace Council, a division of the Boy Scouts of America based in southwestern Indiana
 Buffalo Trace Park, a park near Palmyra, Indiana

See also